Calamity Jane and Sam Bass is a 1949 American Western film directed by George Sherman and starring Yvonne de Carlo, Howard Duff and Dorothy Hart.

Plot
Sheriff Will Egan doesn't want any gamblers in Denton, Texas and is suspicious when stranger Sam Bass arrives in town. The sheriff's sister Kathy likes the newcomer, though, while Calamity Jane is impressed with Sam's way with horses, even more so when Sam spots a poorly shod favorite in a horse race and bets against him, winning a tidy sum.

Sam buys the losing horse with his wager winnings and intends to race him. But when a hired guy poisons the horse, Sam shoots him. Sam tries to turn himself in, but feels he can't get a fair trial and busts out.

Sam becomes an outlaw, robbing banks. He believes Kathy has tricked him and turns to Jane.

He ends up shot, dying in Jane's arms, yet seemingly in love with Kathy.

Cast
 Yvonne de Carlo as Calamity Jane
 Howard Duff as Sam Bass
 Dorothy Hart as Kathy Egan
 Willard Parker as Will Egan
 Norman Lloyd as Jim Murphy
 Lloyd Bridges as Joel Collins
 Marc Lawrence as Harry Dean
 Houseley Stevenson as Dakota
 Milburn Stone as Abe Jones
 Clifton Young as Link
 John Rodney as Morgan
 Roy Roberts as Marshal Peak
 Ann Doran as Mrs. Lucy Egan
 Charles Cane as J. Wells
 Walter Baldwin as Doc Purdy

Production
In March 1948 Universal announced they would make The Story of Sam Bass from a story by director George Sherman. It would be an expensive production in Technicolor shot on location in Kanab, Utah.  Jimmy Stewart was sought to play the title role. The role eventually went to Howard Duff who had just come to notice in Brute Force (1947).

Universal decided to cast Yvonne de Carlo as the female lead. De Carlo was under contract to Universal at the time, and had just been entertaining US troops in Europe. She was reluctant to make the film as it was a Western, but did not want to go on suspension. (She had been briefly engaged to her co-star Howard Duff in April 1947.) Dorothy Hart and Willard Parker signed to play support roles.

Filming started 7 October 1948 in Kanab, Utah. Johnson Canyon, Vermillion Cliffs, and the Gap were additional filming locations.

It was the second film about Calamity Jane made that year, the other being The Paleface.

See also

 List of American films of 1949

References

External links

1949 films
1949 Western (genre) films
American Western (genre) films
Films shot in Utah
Cultural depictions of Calamity Jane
Universal Pictures films
Films directed by George Sherman
1940s American films